Deliver Us from Evil is Budgie's tenth album, released in October 1982 on RCA Records, and according to Burke Shelley its theme "attacks the power structures of East and West and the balance of terror"; it also "refers to all kinds of evil, not just The Bomb and war, but the main theme calls for world peace". One reviewer suggested that the album's lyrics were influenced by Shelley becoming a born-again Christian.

According to Steve Williams, "the concept of the album came about as an accident. We didn't write 'Bored With Russia'. Don (Smith) brought that over from America and that started the ball rolling. We played it a few times and it started the whole concept". The song was written by producer Beau Hill, erroneously credited as Bo Hill, and demoed up with his late-1970s outfit Airborne. It was finally issued on the band's 2003 archives release The Dig.

Reception of the album was mixed, due to a more commercially oriented sound than previous releases. It has been described as either "a complete musical shipwreck"  or  "a collection which not only sounds fantastic but bristles with great songs and exquisite often Who-like arrangements". Their commercial appeal has been justified as a "conscious effort to broaden their horizons" in order to attend "a market more attuned to melody than mere muscle". The album release was followed with a UK tour from late October to December 1982.

Track listing

Personnel
Budgie
Burke Shelley – vocals, bass
John Thomas – guitar
Steve Williams – drums
Duncan Mackay – keyboards

Production
 Don Smith – recording, mixing
 Neill King – assistant engineer
 Keith Finney – assistant engineer
 Julian Mendelsohn – assistant engineer

Charts
Album

References

Budgie (band) albums
1982 albums
New Wave of British Heavy Metal albums
RCA Records albums